Michael Conlan may refer to:

Michael Conlan (boxer) (born 1991), Irish boxer 
Michael Conlan (footballer) (born 1958), former Australian rules footballer